Le Crest is a commune in the Puy-de-Dôme department in Auvergne-Rhône-Alpes in central France. It is part of the urban area of Clermont-Ferrand.

Originally, it was a market village in a rural area known for viticulture and other agricultural crops. As in areas of Italy, the ancient village developed around a fortress chateau built on a hilltop for defensive purposes. Dwellings of commoners were built outside the walls of the chateau. The village has a central square with a fountain and a market cross. Agricultural fields extend away from the limits of the village, so the people lived near each other in the village and would travel outside to the fields and vineyards to work.

Anton Docher, a missionary Catholic priest who served for 34 years at Pueblo of Isleta in New Mexico, United States, was born in Le Crest in 1852. He was later known as "The Padre of Isleta."

In popular culture 

The activities of the World War II resistance in Le Crest were the subject of the third series of the 1989 television drama Wish Me Luck.
Samuel Gance's historical novel, Anton ou la trajectoire d'un père (2013), recounts the adventurous life of Father Anton Docher after he emigrated to the United States. Much of it is set in the village. It describes the life of the wine growers of the 19th century.

Famous people

 Anton Docher, was born in Le Crest. He later became a Catholic missionary who traveled to America and defended the New Mexico natives.
 Jim Rotondi, American jazz trumpeter and flugelhornist lives in Le Crest. One of his compositions entitled "Le Crest" is dedicated to the village on his album "Dark Blue" (2016). 
 Aurélien Rougerie, rugby team player, capitain of ASM et French champion in 2010 and 2017 lived in Le Crest.

Gallery

See also
Communes of the Puy-de-Dôme department
Anton Docher
Jim Rotondi

References

Crest